Fofudja is an internet and social phenomenon in the Ukrainian segment of the LiveJournal community. While its name denotes a piece of religious clothing, it has been used lately as a satirical protest against alleged Russian imperialism, as well as xenophobia, anti-Ukrainian sentiment, antisemitism and religious intolerance. By application of reductio ad absurdum this phenomenon involves people assuming comically exaggerated xenophobic and antisemitic views with the aim to mock them. As such, members of the Fofudja community sarcastically purport to be members of the supposedly oppressed Russian-speaking minority in Ukraine suffering from nationalist and Zionist oppression. By adopting the language and many of the ideas of Russian nationalists and comically exaggerating them members of the fofudja community thus make an effort to repudiate them.

Many believe this original Ukrainian creation to be the means to combat prejudice and xenophobia exhibited towards Ukrainians in modern Russia and to mock Russian nationalists within Ukraine proper. 

The meme rapidly gained popularity in the Ukrainian segment of Internet as an ironical nickname of some Russian nationalists and Orthodox fundamentalists.

Origins of the term

Etymology
The term "fofudja" long remained unknown to the general public of Ukraine and Russia. The word was quite obscure and was not included in several editions of orthographic dictionaries either in Ukraine or Russia.

According to the Brockhaus and Efron Encyclopedic Dictionary, fofudja is an oriental precious cloth woven with gold thread and often used in ceremonial garments in the Byzantine Empire during the time of Kievan Rus and similar to an ephod. Fofudjawas was mentioned as a form of payment in the 12th century birch bark documents found in the Veliky Novgorod excavation. Fofudja was mentioned in the Radziwiłł Chronicle in the 13th century when Leo VI the Wise rewarded Oleg of Novgorod with gold, fofudja and other items. The term is mentioned again when Vladimir II Monomakh distributed fofudja, among other goods, to the people on their way to the church.

Origins in LiveJournal 
The word "fofudja" appeared in a LiveJournal community. The theme of this phenomenon can be traced back to another widely popular Ukrainian Internet creation — a novel "The City of Lvov". This satirical Internet novel written by "Professor" Ivan Denikin (a pen name of an unknown joker) deals with a few Russians traveling to Lviv and on their way encountering "unspeakable suffering" of the Russian-speaking population of Ukraine brought on by Ukrainization. The description of the events was quite satirical and grotesque and this phenomenon of presenting the distorted picture of the world through the eyes of Russian nationalists and Orthodox zealots caught on with the wider public and when LiveJournal Fofudja was launched on March 12, 2006, its popularity grew exponentially.

Main features and usage 

The main symbol of this phenomenon is the fofudja itself. In the view of some observers the name was probably selected because of a number of factors: because of its obscurity, because it sounds similar to a piece of clothing called , and also due to its Byzantine origin and orthodox symbolism.  
Members of the community sarcastically position themselves as semi-underground Russian minority in present-day Ukraine, proud Russian patriots and devout Orthodox Christians. They also pretend to be fiercely chauvinistic with well defined xenophobic and antisemitic views. As such, the generally accepted view of the community is that they are living on eternal Russian lands, speak the only acceptable and "normal" Russian language and patiently await imminent liberation from Ukrainian and Jewish oppression. The latter are termed with one derogatory word for both ethnicities: Жидобандеровцьі (Zhidobanderovtsy, Kike-Banderites).

Fofudja as a piece of religious clothing is meant to be a symbol of Russian Orthodoxy and of Russian culture. Participants believe that they will be persecuted by Ukrainian authorities for wearing it in public as a piece of national Russian costume. In fact, the leader of Ukrainian communists Petro Symonenko was asked in an Internet conference the following question:

"Hello, I am from Kherson oblast and I am an ethnic Russian. My daughter was prohibited from wearing a fofudja at school, a symbol of Russian culture — on the grounds that the state language is Ukrainian. I just wanted to ask you, Peter Nikolayevich, for how long [will it last]?

Unsuspecting of being a victim of a practical joke by members of the fofudja community and willing to profit on the sensitive inter-ethnic question Mr. Symonenko promised to "look into it".

One other particular feature of this Internet phenomenon is the peculiar language use. While only Russian is being used (as all other languages are deemed to be substandard) it is spelled for added comic effect with Ukrainian letters. Also, a digraph "ьі" is used for the Cyrillic letter "ы" absent in the Ukrainian alphabet. One of the anonymous contributors at a site spawned off by this phenomenon explained it in the following manner:

"Please forgive me for using these disgusting Little Russian (I would even call them Micro Russian) letters, but evil Kike-Banderites pulled with pliers all the keys with Russian characters out of the keyboard and burned them. You can't even imagine all the suffering they put the Russophones through!" 
 
Trying to express their admiration for the Imperial Russia some usage of the old style Cyrillic has also been noted. The symbol of "fofudja", the catchphrase "доколє" ("for how long" "until when", an archaic question word), the Russian-Ukrainian letter mix and the Imperial Cyrillic — these are the distinctive features of this Internet phenomenon that spread beyond the Live Journal blog and into the wider community in Ukraine. It is becoming commonly used in everyday speech in Ukraine, on numerous Internet blog sites and has been noted lately in print as well. The phenomenon of the catchphrase Dokole (Доколє) is believed to be in an attempt to exploit the language of the Orthodox and Russian nationalist zealots that have become popular in Russia.

Examples of usage 

The use of numerous abbreviations is also one of the characteristic features of the Fofudja community:

 І.З.Т. — ізвінітє за тавтологію (Pardon my tautology).
 І.З.І.Ж.Б.К. — ізвінітє за іспользованіє жидобандеровской клавіатурьі (Please excuse the use of Kike-Banderite keyboard).

See also
 Ukrainophobia
 Padonki
 Preved

References

Sources
 Fofudja LiveJournal (Rus.)
 New Fofudija LiveJournal (Rus.)
 "Under the Omophorion of St. Fofudja" (Dzerkalo Tyzhnia) (Ukr./Rus.)
 "Fofudja Conqures Ukrainian Cyberspace" (Nasha Nyva) (Belarus.)
 Za-nashe-delo LJ community (Rus.)
 Novel: The City of Lvov (Rus.)
 The Road of Putinism (newspaper) (Rus.)
 Fofudja - Ukrainian answer to Moscow's "Preved". (Internet Reporter) (Ukr.)
 "Daddy, daddy, our nets have pulled out a Fofudja!" (Izvestia)(Rus.)
  One of the Worst Kind of Filth That Hangs Over the Russian Movement is Probably the Fofudja (Na Zlobu) (Rus.)

Internet memes
Ukrainian culture
Christian clothing
Anti-Russian sentiment